Ahmed Al-Malki (born 20 January 1991) is a Saudi football player.

References

1991 births
Living people
Saudi Arabian footballers
Ettifaq FC players
Al-Qadsiah FC players
Al-Fayha FC players
Al-Nahda Club (Saudi Arabia) players
Saudi First Division League players
Association football midfielders